The Cedar Valley Formation is a geologic formation in Iowa. It preserves fossils dating back to the Devonian period.  No type locality has ever been designated for this formation, but it is best known for limestone and dolomite exposures in and around Johnson County, Iowa.  The formation is exposed in numerous road cuts, quarries and valley walls over much of north-east and north-central Iowa.

See also

 List of fossiliferous stratigraphic units in Iowa
 Paleontology in Iowa

References

Devonian Iowa
Devonian southern paleotemperate deposits